twentytwenty is a live album by Sara Niemietz. Recorded just days before the COVID-19 pandemic lock-down (February 27 and 28, 2020), at Apogee Studios in Santa Monica, California, the digital and CD-ROM versions contain over sixty-nine minutes of music.  New arrangements of songs from previously released albums, Get Right (2019) and Travel Light (2017), had matured, and the group (Niemietz, W.G. Snuffy Walden and Jonathan Richards) wanted to record the updated versions, and four new songs, before a live audience.  Martin Diller (drums), Andrew Kesler (keys), Alex Nester (vocals) and Mollie Weaver (vocals) also perform on twentytwenty. In addition to the four music videos released as singles, Niemietz created twelve podcasts documenting the progression of each rendition of the songs.

Track listing

CD and digital

LP vinyl

DVD

Charts

References 

2020 live albums
Sara Niemietz albums